Stokes's law of sound attenuation is a formula for the attenuation of sound in a Newtonian fluid, such as water or air, due to the fluid's viscosity.  It states that the amplitude of a plane wave decreases exponentially with distance traveled, at a rate  given by

The law and its derivation were published in 1845 by the Anglo-Irish physicist G. G. Stokes, who also developed Stokes's law for the friction force in fluid motion. A generalisation of Stokes attenuation taking into account the effect of thermal conductivity was proposed by the German physicist Gustav Kirchhoff in 1868.

Sound attenuation in fluids is also accompanied by acoustic dispersion, meaning that the different frequencies are propagating at different sound speeds.

Interpretation
Stokes's law of sound attenuation applies to sound propagation in an isotropic and homogeneous Newtonian medium.  Consider a plane sinusoidal pressure wave that has amplitude  at some point. After traveling a distance  from that point, its amplitude  will be

The parameter  is dimensionally the reciprocal of length.
In the International System of Units (SI), it is expressed in neper per meter or simply reciprocal of meter.

Importance of volume viscosity
The law is amended to include a contribution by the volume viscosity :

The volume viscosity coefficient is relevant when the fluid's compressibility cannot be ignored, such as in the case of ultrasound in water. The volume viscosity of water at 15 C is 3.09 centipoise.

Modification for very high frequencies

Stokes's law is actually an asymptotic approximation for low frequencies of a more general formula involving relaxation time :

See also
 Acoustic attenuation

References

Colloidal chemistry
Fluid dynamics
Acoustics